The Gold Cross of Zimbabwe (Shona: Ndarama Muchinjikwa ye Zimbabwe) is Zimbabwe's highest military decoration awarded for conspicuous valour by members of the Security Forces in combat. It replaced the Grand Cross of Valour in October 1980.

Recipients
 Danny Stannard
 Squadron Leader Earnest Matsambira
 Group Captain  Ishmael Kadenga
 Group Captain Micheal Dhabha
Major Charles Sambulo
Corporal Samson Moyo
Major Judgemore Cheuka (posthumously)
Colonel Flint Magama (posthumously)

References

Courage awards
Orders, decorations, and medals of Zimbabwe